Walter Facchinetti (born 29 March 1947) is an Italian boxer. He competed in the men's light heavyweight event at the 1968 Summer Olympics. At the 1968 Summer Olympics, he defeated Josef Kapín of Czechoslovakia, before losing to Kurt Baumgartner of Austria.

References

External links
 

1947 births
Living people
Italian male boxers
Olympic boxers of Italy
Boxers at the 1968 Summer Olympics
Sportspeople from the Province of Varese
Light-heavyweight boxers
20th-century Italian people